Heinz Meier is a Swiss bobsledder who competed in the late 1970s. He won a gold medal in the two-man event at the 1977 FIBT World Championships in St. Moritz.

References

External links
Bobsleigh two-man world championship medalists since 1931

Possibly living people
Swiss male bobsledders
Year of birth missing (living people)